The hypothenar muscles are a group of three muscles of the palm that control the motion of the little finger.

The three muscles are:
 Abductor digiti minimi
 Flexor digiti minimi brevis
 Opponens digiti minimi

Structure
The muscles of hypothenar eminence are from medial to lateral:
 Opponens digiti minimi
 Flexor digiti minimi brevis
 Abductor digiti minimi

The intrinsic muscles of hand can be remembered using the mnemonic, "A OF A OF A" for, Abductor pollicis brevis, Opponens pollicis, Flexor pollicis brevis (the three thenar muscles), Adductor pollicis, and the three hypothenar muscles, Opponens digiti minimi, Flexor digiti minimi brevis, Abductor digiti minimi.

Clinical significance
"Hypothenar atrophy" is associated with the lesion of the ulnar nerve, which supplies the three hypothenar muscles.

Hypothenar hammer syndrome is a vascular occlusion of this region.

See also
 Thenar eminence
 Palmaris brevis

References

External links
 
 
 Slides
 

Muscular system
Hand
Medical mnemonics